Still Life with Spherical Mirror is a lithography print by the Dutch artist M. C. Escher first printed in November 1934. It depicts a setting with rounded bottle and a metal sculpture of a bird with a human face seated atop a newspaper and a book. The background is dark, but in the bottle can be seen the reflection of Escher's studio and Escher himself sketching the scene.

Self-portraits in reflective spherical surfaces can be found in Escher's early ink drawings and in his prints as late as the 1950s. The metal bird/human sculpture is real and was given to Escher by his father-in-law. This sculpture appears again in Escher's later prints Another World Mezzotint (Other World Gallery) (1946) and Another World (1947).

See also
Printmaking

Sources
Locher, J. L. (2000). The Magic of M. C. Escher. Harry N. Abrams, Inc. .

Works by M. C. Escher
1934 paintings
Mirrors in art